Kantha is a village in Asoha block of Unnao district, Uttar Pradesh, India. It hosts two small melas, one of which is the Mahabirji-ka-Mela, held every Tuesday during the month of Jyaistha. People bring sweets, toys, and other items to sell at the fair. Kantha also hosts a market twice per week, on Mondays and Fridays, with vegetables being the main item of trade. As of 2011, the population of Kantha is 9,973, in 2,079 households.

History 
Kantha was historically the largest village in Asoha pargana. It formed a taluqa established c. 1527 and held by a family of Sengar Chhatris, who were the most important dynasty in the pargana. They traced their descent from two brothers, Jagat Sah and Gopal Singh, who originally came from Jagmohanpur across the Yamuna. These two brothers had been in the service of Sheikh Bayazid, a powerful jagirdar in the area who led a long but ultimately unsuccessful rebellion against Babur, the first Mughal emperor. Jagat and Gopal had raised and commanded a cavalry force which was posted at the village Simri, and after Sheikh Bayazid's defeat they took up residence in Kantha, displacing the Lodhs as the local zamindars. The descendants of the two brothers remained joint zamindars of Kantha until the Indian Rebellion of 1857, when the British confiscated the landed properties of Umrao Singh, the descendant of Jagat Sah, for having supported the rebellion. They then granted those estates to Ranjit Singh, the descendant of Gopal Singh, for having supported the British during the rebellion.

The 1961 census recorded Kantha as comprising 20 hamlets, with a total population of 4,473 (2,165 male and 2,308 female), in 675 households and 616 physical houses. The area of the village was given as 5,559 acres. Average attendance of the Mahabirji-ka-Mela was about 3,000 people, and average attendance for the biweekly market was about 300. The village had one grain mill at the time.

References

Villages in Unnao district